Dodger Stadium  is a baseball stadium in the Elysian Park neighborhood of Los Angeles, California. It is the home stadium of Major League Baseball's Los Angeles Dodgers. It is the oldest ballpark in MLB west of the Mississippi River, and third-oldest overall, after Fenway Park in Boston (1912) and Wrigley Field in Chicago (1914), and is the largest baseball stadium in the world by seat capacity. Often referred to as a "pitcher's ballpark", the stadium has seen 13 no-hitters, two of which were perfect games.

The stadium hosted the Major League Baseball All-Star Game in 1980 and 2022—as well as games of 10 World Series (1963, 1965, 1966, 1974, 1977, 1978, 1981, 1988, 2017 and 2018). It also hosted the semifinals and finals of the 2009 and 2017 World Baseball Classics, as well as exhibition baseball during the 1984 Summer Olympics. The stadium hosted a soccer tournament on August 3, 2013, featuring four clubs: the hometown team Los Angeles Galaxy, and Europe's Real Madrid, Everton, and Juventus. The Los Angeles Kings and Anaheim Ducks played a regular season game in 2014 as part of the NHL Stadium Series.

It is sometimes referred to as “Blue Heaven on Earth,” a nickname coined by Dodgers manager Tommy Lasorda.

History

Construction
In the mid-1950s, Brooklyn Dodgers team president Walter O'Malley had tried to build a domed stadium in the New York City borough of Brooklyn, but was unable to reach an agreement with city officials for the land acquisition, and eventually reached a deal with the city of Los Angeles. The land for Dodger Stadium had been seized from local owners and inhabitants in the early 1950s by the city of Los Angeles, using eminent domain with funds from the federal Housing Act of 1949. The city had planned to develop the Elysian Park Heights public housing project, which included two dozen 13-story buildings and more than 160 two-story townhouses, in addition to newly rebuilt playgrounds and schools, and a college.

Before construction could begin on the housing project, the local political climate changed greatly when Norris Poulson was elected mayor of Los Angeles in 1953. Proposed public housing projects such as Elysian Park Heights lost most of their support as they became associated with socialist ideals. Following protracted negotiations, the city purchased the Chavez Ravine property back from the Federal Housing Authority at a drastically reduced price, with the stipulation that the land be used for a public purpose. It was not until June 3, 1958, when Los Angeles voters approved a "Taxpayers Committee for Yes on Baseball" referendum, that the Dodgers were able to acquire  of Chavez Ravine from the city. Los Angeles forcefully evicted residents from their homes, mainly Hispanics.  While Dodger Stadium was under construction, the Dodgers played in the league's largest capacity venue from 1958 through 1961 at their temporary home, the Los Angeles Memorial Coliseum, which could seat in excess of 90,000 people.

Los Angeles–based Mike Davis, in his seminal work on the city, City of Quartz, describes the process of gradually convincing Chavez Ravine homeowners to sell. With nearly all of the original Spanish-speaking homeowners initially unwilling to sell, developers resorted to offering immediate cash payments, distributed through their Spanish-speaking agents. Once the first sales had been completed, remaining homeowners were offered increasingly lesser amounts of money, to create a community panic of not receiving fair compensation, or of being left as one of the few holdouts. Many residents continued to hold out despite the pressure being placed upon them by developers, resulting in the Battle of Chavez Ravine, a ten-year struggle by the residents to maintain control of their property, which they ultimately lost.

Dodger Stadium was the first Major League Baseball stadium since the initial construction of the original Yankee Stadium to be built using 100% private financing, and the last until Oracle Park in San Francisco opened in 2000. Ground was broken for Dodger Stadium on September 17, 1959. The tops of local ridges were removed, and the soil was used to fill in Sulfur and Cemetery Ravines to provide a level surface for a parking lot and the stadium. A local elementary school (Palo Verde) was simply buried rather than demolished, and sits beneath the parking lot northwest of third base. A total of 21,000 precast concrete units, some weighing as much as 32 tons, were fabricated onsite and lowered into place with a specially built crane to form the stadium's structural framework. The stadium was originally designed to be expandable to 85,000 seats by expanding the upper decks over the outfield pavilions; the Dodgers have never pursued such a project.

Dodger Stadium was also the home of the Los Angeles Angels from 1962 through 1965. To avoid constantly referring to their landlords, the Angels called the park Chavez Ravine Stadium (or just "Chavez Ravine"), after the geographic feature in which the stadium sits.

Frank McCourt era

At the conclusion of the 2005 season, the Los Angeles Dodgers made major renovations during the subsequent off-season.

The largest of these improvements was the replacement of nearly all the seats in the stadium. The seats that were removed had been in use since 1975 and helped give the stadium its unique "space age" feel with a color palette of bright yellow, orange, blue, and red. The new seats are in the original (more muted) 1962 color scheme consisting of yellow, light orange, turquoise, and sky blue. 2,000 pairs of seats were made available for purchase at $250, with the proceeds going to charity.

The baseline seating sections have been converted into retro-style "box" seating, adding leg room and a table. Other repairs were made to the concrete structure of the stadium. These improvements mark the second phase of a multi-year improvement plan for Dodger Stadium.

Renovations

Between 2003 and 2005, Dodger Stadium upgraded with LED video displays.

In 2008, the Dodgers announced a $412 million project to build a Dodger museum, shops, and restaurants around Dodger Stadium. In a press release, the team described the various features of the renovation as follows:
Dodger Way – A tree-lined entrance will lead to a landscaped grand plaza where fans can gather beyond center field. The plaza will connect to a promenade that features restaurants, shops and the Dodger Experience museum showcasing the history of the Dodgers in an interactive setting.
Green Necklace – The vibrant street setting of Dodger Way links to a beautiful perimeter around Dodger Stadium, enabling fans to walk around the park, outdoors yet inside the stadium gates. This Green Necklace will transform acres of parking lots into a landscaped outdoor walkway connecting the plaza and promenade to the rest of the ballpark.
Top of the Park – The Green Necklace connects to a large scale outdoor plaza featuring breathtaking 360° views spanning the downtown skyline and Santa Monica Bay, the Santa Monica and San Gabriel Mountains, and the Dodger Stadium diamond.

In the 2008–2009 off-season, the upper levels of the stadium were supposed to be renovated to match the repairs and improvements made to the field level. The improvements were to include the removal of the trough urinals in the men's restrooms, new concession stands and earthquake retrofitting to the concrete structure. It was also to include the replacement of the outfield scoreboards and monitors with new HD monitors. Due to the 2009 World Baseball Classic hosted at Dodger Stadium, these renovations were put on hold. The divorce of Frank and Jamie McCourt, as well as a weak economy, were the reasons for the postponement.

To pay for an outstanding loan with the Dodgers former owner News Corporation, former owner Frank McCourt used Dodger Stadium as collateral to obtain a $250 million loan.

In 2008, the Los Angeles City Council voted unanimously to give the Dodger Stadium area bounded by Academy Rd, Lookout Dr. and Stadium Way its own zip code, 90090 (as of July 2009). This also gives the area a new name, Dodgertown. The signs from the former Dodgertown spring training facility in Vero Beach, Florida will likely be integrated into the $500 million project.

New ownership and further renovation

Following the sale of the Dodgers in 2012, the team brought in the architect, urban planner, and stadium specialist Janet Marie Smith to lead renovations efforts to the 50-year-old stadium. Renovations to Dodger Stadium began in the winter of 2012. Both video boards were replaced with High Definition screens, and new clubhouses and weight rooms were installed. The restrooms, concession stands, sound system and batting cages were also improved and renovated.

Dodgers owner Guggenheim Partners internally discussed moving the Dodgers to a new stadium at a Downtown Los Angeles site proposed by the Anschutz Entertainment Group to allow an NFL team to build a stadium at the Dodger Stadium site. Guggenheim Partners also considered allowing an NFL team to build a stadium next to Dodger Stadium. The NFL eventually chose to build SoFi Stadium in the City of Inglewood.

The extensive renovations to Dodger Stadium were ready for the 2013 season and included new HD hexagonal video and scoreboards, a new sound system, wider concourses, more standing room viewing areas, improved restrooms and a children's playground amongst others.

Between the 2013 and 2014 seasons, more renovations were put in place. Dodger Stadium was the beneficiary of improvements such as wider concourses in the pavilions, new restaurants "Think Blue Bar-B-Que" and "Tommy Lasorda’s Trattoria", dedicated team store buildings replacing the tents that previously served as team stores, bullpen overlooks with overlook bars, and tree relocation at the top of the stadium.

On July 23, 2019, a press conference was held with the presentation of the $100 million renovation to the ballpark, which includes a  center field plaza with a children's playground located between the left field and right field bleachers, the relocation of the Jackie Robinson statue from the left field entrance to the center field playground, as well as a display honoring the Legends of Dodger Baseball, along with a sports bar and a beer garden. Also included are new elevators and escalators which connect the outfield bleachers with the field, loge and reserve levels and a new stadium center main entrance. The renovation was completed while the 2020 regular season was delayed.

Features

Design

Dodger Stadium was one of the last baseball-only facilities built before the dawn of the multi-purpose stadium. It was built near the convergence of several freeways near downtown Los Angeles, with an expansive parking lot surrounding the stadium. With the construction of many new MLB ballparks in recent years, it is now the third-oldest park still in use, and the oldest on the West Coast.

Dodger Stadium offered several innovative design features.  One of these was a covered and screened section of dugout-level seats behind home plate.  Dodger owner Walter O'Malley was inspired to incorporate this feature into the Dodger Stadium design after having seen it at Tokyo's Korakuen Stadium during the Brooklyn Dodgers' postseason goodwill tour of Japan in 1956.  The original dugout seating area was replaced by more conventional box seating in a 1999 renovation, but this feature has been replicated at Progressive Field in Cleveland and Angel Stadium of Anaheim.

Two of Dodger Stadium's most distinctive features are the wavy roof atop each outfield pavilion and the top of a 10-story elevator shaft bearing the Dodger logo rising directly behind home plate at the top of the uppermost seating level.

A unique terraced-earthworks parking lot was built behind the main stands, allowing ticket-holders to park at roughly the level of their seats, minimizing use of ramps once inside. The stadium was also designed to be earthquake-resistant, an important consideration in California, and it has withstood several serious earthquakes.

Dodger Stadium was originally equipped with two large Fair Play electronic scoreboard units above the left- and right-field pavilions. The right-field board displayed in-game information. The left-field board displayed scores of out-of-town games and other messages. Smaller auxiliary scoreboards were installed at field level on the box seat fences beyond the first- and third-base dugouts during the inaugural 1962 season. The left-field message board was replaced by a Mitsubishi Electric Diamond Vision video board in 1980. The field-level auxiliary scoreboards were replaced by larger units installed on the facade of the Loge (second) seating level in 1998; these, in turn, were replaced by a video ribbon board in 2006. Field-level out-of-town scoreboards were installed on the left- and right-field walls in 2003.

Strobe lights were added in 2001; they flash when the Dodgers take the field, after a Dodger home run, and after a Dodger win. In 2018, blue strobe lights were added.

Retired numbers
In addition to those of Don Drysdale (53), Sandy Koufax (32), and Don Sutton (20), the retired numbers of Pee Wee Reese (1), Jackie Robinson (42), Duke Snider (4), Tommy Lasorda (2), Walter Alston (24), Roy Campanella (39), Jim Gilliam (19) and Gil Hodges (14) are mounted on the club level facade near the left field foul pole. On April 15, 2017, to mark the 70th anniversary of Robinson's major league debut, the Dodgers unveiled a bronze statue of the player in the stadium's left-field plaza. The  sculpture depicts Robinson sliding into home plate as a rookie. Also honored on the left field line in addition to the retired numbers are broadcasters Vin Scully and Jaime Jarrin.

Location

Built on top of the historic Los Angeles neighborhood of Chavez Ravine in Solano Canyon, the stadium overlooks downtown Los Angeles and provides views of the city to the south, the green tree-lined hills of Elysian Park to the north and east, and the San Gabriel Mountains beyond the outfield pavilions. Due to dry summers in Southern California, rainouts at Dodger Stadium are rare. Prior to 1976, the Dodgers were rained out only once, against the St. Louis Cardinals, on April 21, 1967, ending a streak of 737 consecutive games without a postponement. On April 12, 1976, the second home rainout ended a streak of 724 straight games. April 19–21, 1988 saw three consecutive rainouts, the only time consecutive games have been rained out at Dodger Stadium. No rainouts occurred between April 21, 1988, and April 11, 1999 – a major league record of 856 straight home games without a rainout. That record has since been broken, with no rainouts since April 17, 2000, 1,471 consecutive games through October 3, 2019

Seating
Dodger Stadium has never increased its seating capacity, and was the only current MLB park (through 2005) that had never done so, due to a conditional-use permit that limits Dodger Stadium's seating capacity to 56,000. Whenever higher revenue lower seats were added some in the upper deck or pavilion were removed to keep the number the same. Through the sale of standing room only tickets, the Dodgers' 2009 home opener drew 57,099 fans, the largest crowd in stadium history. Following a number of incidents in the early 1970s in which fans showered Cincinnati Reds left fielder Pete Rose with beer, bottles, cups, and trash, the sale of beer was discontinued in both pavilions. Beer sales were reinstated in the right field pavilion in 2008, when that section was converted into the All You Can Eat Pavilion. Fans seated in that section can eat unlimited hot dogs and peanuts and also have access to free soft drinks. There is a charge for beer.

With the retirement of the original Yankee Stadium and Shea Stadium in 2008, the park reigned as the largest capacity ballpark in the Majors.

As of 2010, there are a total of 2,098 club seats and 68 luxury suites. Both of these amounts will increase once the renovations are complete, with the necessary offset to comply with its conditional-use permit.

Due to renovations made in the 2012–2013 offseason, the current maximum capacity of Dodger Stadium is less than 56,000, although the team's president, Stan Kasten, refuses to provide an exact number. A 53,393 attendance is considered a sellout. The high water mark since the renovations is 56,800 in Games 3, 4 and 5 of the 2008 NLCS. The team's 2013 media guide and website still report the capacity as 56,000.

Dodger Stadium achieved record paid attendance during the 2019 season with 3,875,656  spectators.

Center field dimension and playing surface

For various reasons, Dodger Stadium has long enjoyed a reputation as a pitchers' park. Also, during evening games, as the sun sets, the surrounding air cools quickly due to the ocean climate, becoming more dense. As a result, deep fly balls that might otherwise be home runs during the day instead often remain in play becoming outs. The park has been home to 12 no-hitters, while players have hit for the cycle just twice in Dodger Stadium.

Dodger Stadium became more neutral with respect to home runs. The stadium does depress doubles and triples quite a bit, due to its uniform outfield walls and relatively small "corners" near the foul poles. However, the extremely short outfield walls near the foul poles also make some balls that would bounce off the wall in other parks go for home runs. With some expansion of the box seat area and the removal of significant foul territory, the ballpark has become more neutral, favoring neither pitchers nor hitters. Baseball-Reference's Park Factor measurement of 102 for the 2006 and 2007 seasons is evidence of this.

Although the distance to center field has been marked at 395 feet since 1973, it is still actually  to center, as has been the case since 1969. The two  signs erected in 1973 are to the left and right of dead center. However, curvature of the fence between the posted distance signs is not exactly radial from home plate, thus the distance from home plate directly to center field is most likely  farther than the posted . As of 2012, distance to center field is indicated , and is located virtually exactly at the center field point.

With the opening of Citi Field and the demolition of Shea Stadium in 2009, Dodger Stadium became the only stadium with symmetrical outfield dimensions remaining in the National League and only one of four total in Major League Baseball. The other three symmetrical fields are Kansas City's Kauffman Stadium, Toronto's Rogers Centre, and Oakland–Alameda County Coliseum, all in the American League.

Pitchers such as Sandy Koufax, Don Drysdale, Don Sutton, Fernando Valenzuela, and Orel Hershiser became superstars after arriving in Los Angeles. The pitcher's edge is also evident in the fact that 13 no-hitters have been thrown in the stadium, including two perfect games (by the Dodgers' Sandy Koufax in 1965, and by Dennis Martínez of the former Montreal Expos in ). Bo Belinsky threw the first ever no-hitter in Dodger Stadium on May 5, 1962, while pitching for the Los Angeles Angels (that club referred to the park as "Chavez Ravine".)

The park's significant advantage was eroded somewhat since 1969, in general because MLB rules were changed after the "Year of the Pitcher" to lower the maximum height of the pitcher's mound, and more specifically because the Dodgers moved the diamond about 10 feet (3 m) towards center field. This also gave the fielders more room to catch foul balls, so there was some tradeoff. Following the 2004 season, the stadium underwent a renovation which significantly reduced the amount of foul territory. Seats were added which were closer to home plate than the pitcher's mound, the dugouts were moved  closer to the field, and previously open space down the foul lines was filled with new seats.

Historic events

1963 World Series
The Dodgers won the 1963 World Series over the New York Yankees, sweeping the Yankees by winning game 4 by a score of 2–1. So far, this remains the only time the Dodgers ever clinched a World Series at Dodger Stadium.

1988 National League Championship Series
Until 1988, Dodger Stadium had never hosted a seventh game of a postseason series. The Dodgers won Game 7 of the 1988 National League Championship Series over the New York Mets, 6–0.

2020 postseason games
In keeping with the decision of Major League Baseball to schedule postseason games for neutral, "bubble" sites in light of the COVID-19 pandemic, Dodger Stadium hosted all games between the Houston Astros and the Oakland Athletics in the 2020 American League Division Series.

The 2020 World Series, which pitted the Dodgers against the Tampa Bay Rays, was played in the neutral site of Globe Life Field in Arlington, Texas. An entrance fee of $75 per car was charged, with no more than 6 occupants per car. Audio play-by-play was broadcast over an FM station. No food or drink was sold, and participants were prohibited from bringing alcohol or "partying away from their car". An estimated 2,000 fans attended each game.

No-hitters in Dodger Stadium
(*-Perfect game)

Home runs out of Dodger Stadium
Six home runs have been hit completely out of Dodger Stadium. Outfielder Willie Stargell of the Pittsburgh Pirates hit two of those home runs. Stargell hit a  home run off the Dodgers' Alan Foster on August 5, 1969, that completely cleared the right field pavilion and struck a bus parked outside the stadium. Stargell then hit a  home run off Andy Messersmith on May 8, 1973, that landed on the right field pavilion roof and bounced into the parking lot. Dodger catcher Mike Piazza hit a  home run off Frank Castillo of the Colorado Rockies on September 21, 1997, that landed on the left field pavilion roof and skipped under the left field video board and into the parking lot.  On May 22, 1999, St. Louis Cardinals first baseman Mark McGwire cleared the left field pavilion with a  home run off the Dodgers' Jamie Arnold. On May 12, 2015, Giancarlo Stanton of the Miami Marlins hit a  home run over the left-field roof off Mike Bolsinger and most recently, on September 30, 2021, Fernando Tatís Jr. hit a ball out of the stadium off the top of the left field pavilion roof.

Notable events

Park usage
Dodger Stadium has also staged other sporting events such as boxing, a basketball game featuring the Harlem Globetrotters and a ski-jumping exhibition, as well as the baseball competition of the 1984 Summer Olympic Games and is currently designated to host softball and baseball for the 2028 Olympic Games with Angel Stadium.

Baseball
In 1992, baseball games from April 30 to May 3 against the Montreal Expos were postponed due to the 1992 Los Angeles riots. Three consecutive days of double headers were held later in the season on July 6 to 8.

Soccer
Dodger Stadium hosted a soccer doubleheader on August 3, 2013, part of the 2013 International Champions Cup, featuring Real Madrid of Spain, Everton of England, Juventus of Italy and Los Angeles Galaxy of Major League Soccer in a tournament semifinal. The field dimensions were from the third base side to right field; temporary grass was covered on the pitcher's mound and the infield. The tournament was a semifinal and Real Madrid defeated Everton 2-1 and Los Angeles Galaxy defeated Juventus 3–1.

Hockey
Dodger Stadium hosted its first National Hockey League game between the Los Angeles Kings and the Anaheim Ducks on January 25, 2014, as a part of the 2014 NHL Stadium Series. The Ducks won the game 3–0 in front of 54,099 fans. In addition, the rock band KISS played songs before the game and during its first intermission.

Boxing
On March 21, 1963, Ultiminio "Sugar" Ramos won the WBC and WBA featherweight titles from Davey Moore in ten rounds. Moore died days after this fight. Also on the card, Roberto Cruz KO'd Raymundo "Battling" Torres in one round to win the WBA Junior Welterweight title.

Cricket
On November 15, 2015, Dodger Stadium hosted the third and final game of the Cricket All-Stars Series 2015, featuring many retired cricket players from around the world and led by great cricket legends Sachin Tendulkar and Shane Warne. Warne's Warriors defeated Sachin's Blasters by 4 wickets to sweep the three-game series. The ends were named after Sandy Koufax and Don Sutton, two Hall of Fame pitchers for LA Dodgers.

Olympics
 The stadium hosted Baseball at the 1984 Summer Olympics
 The stadium hosted the opening ceremony of the 1991 U.S. Olympic Festival.
 During the 2028 Summer Olympics, the stadium will host Baseball and Softball.

Concerts
Many of the world's top rock, pop and electronic bands have performed at Dodger Stadium, including acts such as The Cure, KISS, The Rolling Stones, The Beatles, Bee Gees, Elton John (2 Nights), Lady Gaga, Simon and Garfunkel, David Bowie, Green Day, Fall Out Boy, Weezer, Madonna, Beyoncé, Genesis, Guns N' Roses (2 Nights), Eric Clapton, Depeche Mode (2 Nights), U2 (2 Nights), Dave Matthews Band, Bruce Springsteen and the E Street Band, Dead & Company, and Michael Jackson in 1984 with The Jacksons (6 sold-out concerts, 330,000 people). On October 25 and 26, 1975, Elton John performed 2 sold-out concerts, these are widely regarded as two of his most famous shows. In July 2017, it hosted the Classic West concert, the first night had featured The Eagles (in their full first concert after the January 18th, 2016 death of founding member Glenn Frey) his place has been taken by his son Deacon Frey and American country artist Vince Gill, with supporting acts The Doobie Brothers and Steely Dan. The second night featured Earth, Wind & Fire, Journey, and Fleetwood Mac. On July 13, 2019, Paul McCartney performed at Dodger Stadium as part of his Freshen Up tour, with Ringo Starr and Joe Walsh as guest performers.
The Three Tenors — José Carreras, Plácido Domingo and Luciano Pavarotti — gave a one-night-only show at Los Angeles' Dodger Stadium on July 16, 1994. It was a watched by a billion people worldwide. In 2022, Gabriel "Fluffy" Iglesias became the first stand-up comedian to sell out Dodger Stadium. The concert was taped for Netflix and released on October 18, 2022 as "Stadium Fluffy". On November 20, 2022, Elton John Sold out Dodger Stadium for his final North American concert, it was streamed live on disney plus, and is currently streaming as of 1/16/2023. He played three total shows there in 2022.

In music video
Fleetwood Mac's music video for the song "Tusk" was recorded and filmed at the empty stadium in 1979.

In film and TV

 The ending of the 1985 film Better Off Dead takes place at Dodger Stadium.
 The baseball scenes from the first Naked Gun film were filmed at Dodger Stadium, although the team represented in the film was the California Angels. (The Angels played their first few seasons at "Chavez Ravine" while the ballpark now known as Angel Stadium was being built.)
 This was the starting point of a popular reality show, The Amazing Race in its fourth season.
 The parking lot of Dodger Stadium was used in the 2001 movie The Fast and the Furious, in which Brian O'Conner (played by actor Paul Walker) drifts his 1995 Mitsubishi Eclipse around the parking lot.
 Dodger Stadium was used as the model for Metropolis's baseball stadium in the 2006 film Superman Returns. The end of the airplane rescue scene was filmed at Dodger Stadium, and a CGI backdrop for the city was added behind the outfield.
 The stadium also appeared in the 2003 film The Core during the scene where the space shuttle takes an unexpected crash landing.
 In a scene from the 2007 film Transformers, an empty Dodger Stadium is depicted being hit by the Autobot Jazz's protoform, which crashes through the upper deck and lands in the outfield. Though empty, the stadium's lights are on.
 In the 2010 film Takers, after fleeing in a helicopter from the initial bank robbery, the crew flies to the parking lot at Dodger Stadium where their escape vehicles are parked. They then blow up the helicopter in the parking lot at Dodger Stadium 
 In the closing scene of the 2012 film Rock of Ages, Dodger Stadium is seen hosting a concert for the rock band Arsenal, fronted by Stacee Jaxx (played by Tom Cruise).
 In a 1963 episode of Mister Ed titled "Leo Durocher meets Mister Ed", Ed offers hitting tips to Dodgers coach Leo Durocher ahead of a big game.
 Curb Your Enthusiasm filmed there in May 2003
 In the 2023 movie Creed III, the championship fight between Adonis Creed and Dame Anderson takes place at Dodger Stadium. In the movie, it is known as the "Battle for Los Angeles."

Holiday Festival
On November 8, 2021, Dodger organization announced the “2021 Dodger Holiday Festival” event. The event will be held nightly from November 26-December 31, with the exception of the following dark days 11/29, 11/30, 12/6, 12/7, and 12/25. The event will include an ice skating rink, scenic and light displays, holiday themed food and beverages, and Santa photos for guests.

Other events
 Pope John Paul II celebrated Mass at Dodger Stadium on September 16, 1987. 
 Greg Laurie held his Harvest Crusades at Dodger Stadium in 2011 and 2012.

Express buses 

The Los Angeles County Metropolitan Transportation Authority (Metro) has two Dodger Stadium Express bus routes that transport fans to and from the stadium during home games. The service is funded by the Mobile Source Air Pollution Reduction Review Committee and Metro ExpressLanes toll revenue.

Union Station route
Buses on the Union Station route run non-stop between Union Station and Dodger Stadium. Service to the stadium begins operating 90 minutes before the start of the game, with departures every 10 minutes until the 3rd Inning. Buses stop at Center Field and Top Deck. Return service continues until 45 minutes after the final out or 20 minutes after post-game events, with buses departing as they fill.

South Bay route
Buses on the South Bay route operate between the South Bay and Dodger Stadium along the Harbor Transitway, making stops at Slauson, Manchester, Harbor Freeway, Rosecrans, and Harbor Gateway Transit Center. Service to the stadium begins operating two hours before the start of the game, with departures every 20 minutes until the start of the game. Buses stop at Right Field. Return service begins at the end of the 7th inning and continues until 45 minutes after the final out or 20 minutes after post-game events, with buses departing as they fill.

Climate

See also 

 List of Major League Baseball stadiums

References

Sources
Clem's Baseball: Source for dimensions
Ballpark Digest Visit to Dodger Stadium
Dodger Stadium history and facts
Official Website of former Dodger owner Walter O'Malley

External links

Stadium site on MLB.com
   Dodger Stadium Seating Chart 
Los Angeles Sports Council 
Dodger Stadium Review and Photos
Image of a worker clearing a drain of a flooded Dodger Stadium, California, 1977. Los Angeles Times Photographic Archive (Collection 1429). UCLA Library Special Collections, Charles E. Young Research Library, University of California, Los Angeles.

1962 establishments in California
Baseball venues in Los Angeles
Boxing venues in Los Angeles
California Angels stadiums
Cricket grounds in the United States
Elysian Park, Los Angeles
Ice hockey venues in Los Angeles
Landmarks in Los Angeles
Los Angeles Dodgers stadiums
Los Angeles Angels stadiums
Major League Baseball venues
Olympic baseball venues
Olympic softball venues
Outdoor ice hockey venues in the United States
Softball venues in Los Angeles
Sports venues completed in 1962
Venues of the 1984 Summer Olympics
Venues of the 2028 Summer Olympics